Jorge Maciel Andrés (born 31 August 1970) is a Spanish windsurfer. He competed at the 1996 Summer Olympics and the 2000 Summer Olympics.

Notes

References

External links
 
 
 

1970 births
Living people
Spanish windsurfers
Spanish male sailors (sport)
Olympic sailors of Spain
Sailors at the 1996 Summer Olympics – Mistral One Design
Sailors at the 2000 Summer Olympics – Mistral One Design
Sportspeople from the Province of Pontevedra